If You Wish It (French: Si tu veux) is a 1932 French comedy film directed by André Hugon and starring Jeanne Boitel, Armand Bernard and Janine Merrey.

The film's sets were designed by Robert-Jules Garnier.

Cast
 Jeanne Boitel as Maryse  
 Armand Bernard as Jérôme  
 Janine Merrey as Irma  
 Jacques Maury as André  
 Alice Tissot as La logeuse  
 André Dubosc as Ducygne 
 Henri Kerny as Barette  
 Antonin Berval as Renaud 
 Hélène Regelly

References

Bibliography 
 Crisp, Colin. Genre, Myth and Convention in the French Cinema, 1929-1939. Indiana University Press, 2002.

External links 
 

1932 films
1932 comedy films
French comedy films
1930s French-language films
Films directed by André Hugon
French black-and-white films
1930s French films